Live in Hamburg may refer to:
Live in Hamburg (Jean-Luc Ponty album), 1976
Live in Hamburg (Roger Chapman album), 1979
Live in Hamburg (Maria McKee album), 2004
Live in Hamburg (Böhse Onkelz album), 2004
Live in Hamburg (Wishbone Ash album), 2007
Live in Hamburg (Scooter Album), 2010
Live in Hamburg (Saga album), 2016